Hoideok Hwang clan is a Korean clan. Their Bon-gwan is in Daedeok District, Daejeon. According to the research held in 2015, the number of Hoideok Hwang clan’s member was 8385. Hwang Rak, a minister in Han dynasty, began the Hwang clan in Korea. Hwang Rak had an accident on the sea on his way to Vietnam as an envoy in 28 CE during Emperor Guangwu of Han's reign. He worked as a minister of justice (刑部尚書, Xingbu Shangshu) and a founding Minister. Then, he became Prince of Daedeok.

See also 
 Korean clan names of foreign origin

References

External links 
 

 
Hwang clans
Korean clan names of Chinese origin